Avinger is a town in Cass County, in the U.S. state of Texas. The population was 444 at the 2010 census, and 371 at the 2020 U.S. census. State Representative David Simpson, a Republican from Longview, served from 1993 to 1998 as the mayor of Avinger.

History
The town was established in 1876.

Geography

Avinger is located in southwestern Cass County at  (32.898288, –94.554464). Texas State Highway 49 passes through the town center, leading northwest  to Hughes Springs and southeast  to Jefferson. Texas State Highway 155 crosses Highway 49 southeast of the town center and leads northeast  to Linden, the Cass County seat, and southwest  to Gilmer.

Demographics

As of the 2020 United States census, there were 371 people, 123 households, and 64 families residing in the town.

At the publication of the 2000 United States census, there were 464 people, 203 households, and 132 families residing in the town. The population density was 248.2 people per square mile (95.8/km2). There were 236 housing units at an average density of 126.3 per square mile (48.7/km2). The racial makeup of the town was 75.43% White, 22.63% African American, 0.43% from other races, and 1.51% from two or more races. Hispanic or Latino of any race were 1.94% of the population.

Education
The town of Avinger is served by the Avinger Independent School District and home to the Avinger High School Indians.

References

External links
Avinger Area Chamber of Commerce

Towns in Cass County, Texas
Towns in Texas